Lost Ember is an adventure game developed by Mooneye Studios and released in 2019.  Players explore the ruins of a lost civilization by possessing various animals.

Gameplay 
Lost Ember is a third-person adventure game.  Players control an amnesiac wolf.  A spirit asks the player for help in reaching the afterlife and explains that people disqualified from entering the afterlife are reincarnated as animals.  The player and the spirit set off to find out why the player is barred from the afterlife and to assist the spirit.  The game does not have traditional puzzles, though players may encounter impassable terrain.  To continue, players can possess other animals they encounter.  Possessing a bird allows players to fly over terrain inaccessible to the wolf, and fish can swim across lakes.  By exploring nearby ruins, the player and spirit learn more about their past lives and the civilization they came from.  Unlocking these memories allows them to progress through the game and enter the afterlife.

Development 
Mooneye Studios successfully crowdfunded Lost Ember in 2016.  It was released in late 2019 for Windows, PlayStation 4, and Xbox One.  It was ported to Nintendo Switch in September 2020.

Reception 
Luke Kemp of PC Gamer rated the game 90/100 and called it "a wonderful, unique, and unforgettable experience with a love for nature".  Richard Hoover reviewed the game for Adventure Gamers and rated it 3/5 stars.  He wrote, "Lost Embers animal body possession provides some fun moments but the lack of anything substantive to do with it makes for a beautiful but surprisingly empty experience."  Reviewing the PlayStation 4 version, Jon Bailes of Polygon criticized the game's performance.  Although he said Lost Ember becomes more enjoyable later on, Bailes compared it negatively to Journey and said that Lost Ember "takes way too long to get flowing properly".  Brett Posner-Ferdman, who reviewed the Nintendo Switch version for Nintendo Life, also criticized the game's performance.  He rated it 4/10 stars and wrote that the game "fails to deliver on nearly every front".

References

External links 
 

2019 video games
Windows games
PlayStation 4 games
Xbox One games
Nintendo Switch games
Single-player video games
Indie video games
Adventure games
Unreal Engine games
Video games about animals
Video games about spirit possession
Video games developed in Germany
Video games set in a fictional country